Ephemerides Theologicae Lovanienses is a quarterly peer-reviewed academic journal covering theology and canon law. It was established in 1924 and is published by Peeters. It publishes articles, notes and comments, and reviews in English, French, and German. The journal is abstracted and indexed in the ATLA Religion Database and Scopus.

Supplements
The journal irregularly publishes supplements under the title Bibliotheca Ephemeridum Theologicarum Lovaniensium.

See also
List of theological journals
https://www.brepolsonline.net/doi/abs/10.1484/J.RHE.5.119140

References

External links

Catholic studies journals
Publications established in 1924
Multilingual journals
Quarterly journals